Peter Minder (born 30 November 1956) is a Swiss modern pentathlete. He competed at the 1984 Summer Olympics.

References

External links
 

1956 births
Living people
Swiss male modern pentathletes
Olympic modern pentathletes of Switzerland
Modern pentathletes at the 1984 Summer Olympics